Sacred Songs for the Holy Year is a 1949 album by RCA of recordings from 1920 and earlier by the Italian tenor Enrico Caruso. Originally RCA-Victor album DM-1359 it was reedited in 1977 by the record label RCA Victor.

Track listing
 Agnus dei (Georges Bizet)
 Pietà, signore (Abraham Louis Niedermeyer)
 Ingemisco (Giuseppe Verdi)
 Domine deus (Gioachino Rossini) 
 Cujus animam (Gioachino Rossini)

References

1940s classical albums
1949 albums
RCA Records albums
Enrico Caruso albums
Latin-language albums